Boonsville is an unincorporated community in Wise County, Texas.

History
In 1878, a post office was established in Boonsville. It closed in 1965.

Notable people
Theodore "Ted" Nieman Kincannon (1896-1936), a pioneer of aviation, was born in Boonsville.

References

Unincorporated communities in Wise County, Texas
Unincorporated communities in Texas